Wootton Hall may refer to
 Wootton Hall, a house in Wootton Wawen
 GWR 4900 Class 4979 Wootton Hall, a preserved steam locomotive